Nadryby is a municipality and village in Plzeň-North District in the Plzeň Region of the Czech Republic. It has about 100 inhabitants.

Geography
It lies in the Plasy Uplands. The municipality is situated on the left bank of the Berounka River, between meanders of the river, which forms significant part of the municipal border.

History
The first written mention of Nadryby is from 1216.

References

Villages in Plzeň-North District